Sagalassa falsissima is a moth in the family Brachodidae. It was described by Paul Dognin in 1910. It is found in Colombia.

References

Natural History Museum Lepidoptera generic names catalog

Brachodidae
Moths described in 1910